Çobanyıldızı is a village in the Pülümür District, Tunceli Province, Turkey. The village is populated by Kurds of the Keman tribe and had a population of 40 in 2021.

The hamlets of Ayaz, Aydınlar, Beyaztaş, Çayırlı, Değirmendere, Derekomu, Erik, Gözecik, Kalınkaş, Kuşbaşı and Uluca are attached to the village.

References 

Kurdish settlements in Tunceli Province
Villages in Pülümür District